Baiardi is a surname. Notable people with the surname include:

 Ana María Baiardi Quesnel (born 1965), Paraguayan diplomat and politician
 Ennio Baiardi (1928–2014), Italian politician
 Michael Baiardi (born 1972), American composer, songwriter, and music producer